Jacob Wilson may refer to:
Jacob Wilson (racing driver) (born 1990), American racing driver
Jacob Wilson (baseball) (born 1992), American baseball utility player
Jacob Wilson (agriculturist) (1836–1905), English land agent, cattle breeder, and agriculturist

See also
Jake Wilson (disambiguation)